Cimbex femoratus, the birch sawfly, is a species of sawfly in the family Cimbicidae.

Varieties
Cimbex femoratus var. griffinii Leach, 1817 
Cimbex femoratus var. pallens Lepeletier, 1823 
Cimbex femoratus var. silvarum Fabricius, 1793 
Cimbex femoratus var. varians Leach, 1817

Description
The head is large, with large and strong mandibles. Wings are smoky brown with brown margins. The thorax is shiny black. The shiny black abdomen shows a whitish band and a large red-brown  band, especially in males. The antennae are black at the base and yellow-orange at the tip. Even the last leg segments are yellowish. The adults fly in May to August.

Larvae are pale bluish-green, about 45 mm long and they look very similar to caterpillars. On the back they usually have a dark, narrow bluish longitudinal stripe. They can be found between June and September and feed exclusively on leaves of birch (Betula sp.)

Distribution
They are widespread throughout Europe and Siberia.

Habitat
These sawflies prefer areas where birch trees can be found.

References
 Biolib
 Fauna Europaea

External links
 EoL
 Nature Spot

Cimbicidae
Sawflies described in 1758
Taxa named by Carl Linnaeus
Hymenoptera of Europe
Fauna of Siberia